Edward Paul Glynn (born June 3, 1953) is an American former professional baseball player. He was a left-handed pitcher who worked in 175 Major League games, all but eight in relief, over ten seasons (1975–1983; 1985) for the Detroit Tigers, New York Mets, Cleveland Indians and Montreal Expos. He is one of the few players in the history of the Mets who grew up in the neighborhood where the team has played since , Flushing, Queens. When Glynn was a student at Francis Lewis High School, he sold hot dogs at Shea Stadium during Mets' games in the late 1960s and early 1970s. As a result, when he later played for the Mets at Shea, the team honored him in a pre-game ceremony in which he was presented with an official Shea Stadium hot dog.

Glynn, however, was bypassed by his hometown team when he graduated from high school in 1971, signing as an undrafted free agent with the Detroit Tigers on September 25, 1971. He worked his way up through the Tiger farm system for four seasons, until he won 11 games in a  season split between the Montgomery Rebels and the Evansville Triplets. On September 19, 1975, he made his Major League debut in relief against the eventual American League champion Boston Red Sox. Entering the game in the fourth inning of a 4–4 tie, he struck out the year's AL Most Valuable Player and Rookie of the Year, Fred Lynn, to snuff out a Boston rally, but one inning later gave up the winning runs on a two-run single by Rico Petrocelli, as Boston won 7–5. Nine days later, Glynn made his first MLB start, lasting six innings against the Milwaukee Brewers and allowing three earned runs. He took the loss, however, as the Tigers were shut out by Larry Anderson.

Starting the year with the Triple-A Tidewater Tides, Glynn was effective in 17 relief appearances and was recalled by the Mets to make his National League debut on June 1, 1979. He earned a save in his maiden NL appearance, working a scoreless 11th inning against the Atlanta Braves and preserving a 5–4 victory for Skip Lockwood. He worked in 46 games, all in relief, that season, and collected a career-high seven saves. Then, he spent the full  season with the Mets — his only full season in the Majors. Traded to the Indians  just prior to the opening of  season, he spent much of that year in Triple-A but returned to Cleveland in May 1982 to work in a career-high 47 games and earn five victories in seven decisions. He then began  with the Indians, but was ineffective and returned to the minor leagues. His final Major League appearances came in relief in May  for the Expos. He retired for the 1988–1989 seasons before attempting a brief comeback with the Tidewater Tides in 1990. All told he pitched in 17 pro seasons.

As a big leaguer, Glynn allowed 261 hits and 151 bases on balls in  innings pitched. He struck out 184 and earned 12 total saves.  His career ERA was 4.33 and career WHIP was 1.557.

References

External links
 or Retrosheet or Venezuelan Professional Baseball League

1953 births
Living people
Águilas del Zulia players
American expatriate baseball players in Canada
Baseball players from New York (state)
Bristol Tigers players
Charleston Charlies players
Cleveland Indians players
Clinton Pilots players
Detroit Tigers players
Evansville Triplets players
Indianapolis Indians players
Lakeland Tigers players
Leones del Caracas players
Maine Guides players
Major League Baseball pitchers
Montgomery Rebels players
Montreal Expos players
Navegantes del Magallanes players
American expatriate baseball players in Venezuela
New York Mets players
Pawtucket Red Sox players
People from Flushing, Queens
San Bernardino Pride players
St. Lucie Legends players
Tiburones de La Guaira players
Tidewater Tides players
Francis Lewis High School alumni